The Eldridge Street Synagogue is a synagogue and National Historic Landmark in Chinatown, Manhattan, New York City. Built in 1887, it is one of the first synagogues erected in the United States by Eastern European Jews.

The Orthodox congregation that constructed the synagogue moved into the downstairs beth midrash in the 1950s, and the main sanctuary was unused until the 1980s, when it was restored to become the Museum at Eldridge Street.

History

The Eldridge Street Synagogue is one of the first synagogues erected in the United States by Eastern European Jews (Ashkenazim). One of the founders was Rabbi Eliahu the Blessed (Borok), formerly the Head Rabbi of St. Petersburg, Russia. It opened in 1887 at 12 Eldridge Street in New York's Lower East Side, serving Congregation Kahal Adath Jeshurun.   The building was designed by the architects Peter and Francis William Herter.  The brothers subsequently received many commissions in the Lower East Side and incorporated elements from the synagogue, such as the stars of David, in their buildings, mainly tenements. When completed, the synagogue was reviewed in the local press. Writers marveled at the imposing Moorish Revival building, with its 70-foot-high dome and barrel vaulted ceiling, magnificent stained-glass rose windows, elaborate brass fixtures and hand-stenciled walls.

As many as 800 families were members of the synagogue in its heyday, from its opening through 1920, and its sanctuary had a seating capacity of 1,000; on High Holidays, police were stationed in the street to control the crowds. Rabbis of the congregation included the famed Rabbi Abraham Aharon Yudelovich, author of many works of Torah scholarship. Throughout these decades the synagogue functioned not only as a house of worship but as an agency for acculturation, a place to welcome new Americans. Before the settlement houses were established and long afterward, poor people could come to be fed, secure a loan, learn about job and housing opportunities, and make arrangements to care for the sick and the dying. The synagogue was, in this sense, a mutual aid society.

For fifty years, the synagogue flourished. Then membership began to dwindle as members moved to other areas, immigration quotas limited the number of new arrivals, and the Great Depression affected the congregants' fortunes. The exquisite main sanctuary was used less and less from the 1930s on. Even so, it hosted notable events such as the funeral of Menahem Mendel Beilis, which had so many attendees that “the crowd could not be contained in the sanctuary. As many as a dozen policemen failed to establish order in the streets.” But by the 1950s, rain leaking in and the instability of the inner stairs forced the congregants to cordon off the sanctuary.

Without the resources needed to heat and maintain the sanctuary, they chose to worship downstairs in the more intimate beth midrash (study hall). The main sanctuary remained empty for twenty-five years, from approximately 1955 to 1980.  In 1986 the non-sectarian, not-for-profit Eldridge Street Project was founded to restore the synagogue and renew it with educational and cultural programs. Paul P. E. Bookson, a former State Senator and Civil Court Justice, was instrumental in maintaining the Orthodox Religious services at the Eldridge Street Synagogue and its building restoration. After his death in 2005, his widow, Mrs. Tova G. Bookson, continued to worship there. At the beginning of the restoration work, in 1989, a skeleton was found in the basement of the synagogue.

Renovation and reopening

On December 2, 2007, after 20 years of renovation work that cost US$20 million, the Eldridge Street Project completed the restoration and opened to the public as the Museum at Eldridge Street, reflecting its cultural and educational mission, within the synagogue building.  The museum offers informative tours that relate to American Jewish history, the history of the Lower East Side and immigration. Occasionally, Jewish religious events are celebrated there, though not in the former main sanctuary.

The effort to return the sanctuary to its Victorian splendor, while maintaining the idiosyncrasies of the original aesthetic and preserving patina of age, included plaster consolidation and replication of ornamental plaster elements, over-paint removal, conservation, in-painting replication of stenciling, wood finishing and decorative painting including: faux-woodgraining, marbleizing, and gilding by skilled craftsmen.

A small number of worshippers of the Orthodox Congregation Kahal Adath Jeshurun continue to hold services at the synagogue; the congregation has rarely missed a Shabbat or holiday service since the synagogue first opened.

The synagogue was designated a National Historic Landmark in 1996.

Gallery

See also
 Oldest synagogues in the United States
 National Register of Historic Places listings in Manhattan below 14th Street
 List of New York City Designated Landmarks in Manhattan below 14th Street

References
Notes

Bibliography
 Polland, Annie. Landmark of the Spirit; The Eldridge Street Synagogue,, Yale University Press, 2009

External links

 Museum at Eldridge Street – official website

Synagogues in Manhattan
History museums in New York City
Jewish museums in New York City
Museums in Manhattan
Synagogues preserved as museums
Lower East Side
Synagogues completed in 1887
National Historic Landmarks in Manhattan
Properties of religious function on the National Register of Historic Places in Manhattan
Synagogues on the National Register of Historic Places in New York City
Orthodox synagogues in New York City
Russian-Jewish culture in New York City
Society museums in New York (state)
19th-century architecture in the United States
Moorish Revival architecture in New York City
Moorish Revival synagogues
1887 establishments in New York (state)
Synagogue buildings with domes
New York City Designated Landmarks in Manhattan